Baldersby St James is a village in the Harrogate district of North Yorkshire, England.

Several notable buildings in the village were commissioned by Viscount Downe of Baldersby Park and designed by William Butterfield in the 1850s. The Church of St James and its lychgate are both Grade I listed and the old vicarage, the school and the school house are all Grade II* listed.

References

External links

Villages in North Yorkshire